Suavitel is a Mexican brand of fabric softener marketed by Colgate-Palmolive. In some countries it is also known as Softlan, Soflan or Soflan-Suavitel.

History
In the 1970s, Colgate-Palmolive Mexico experienced one of its most important moments, when the economic phenomenon known as the “Mexican Miracle” influenced the growth of the economy. As a result, new productive branches emerged within the company. With diversification underway, the company launched liquid cleansers, creams for skin care, the first shampoo for delicate clothes, and the first fabric softener in Mexico, known as Suavitel.

External links
 

Cleaning product brands
Colgate-Palmolive brands